"Freak" is a 1997 song by Australian rock band Silverchair, released as the first single from their second album, Freak Show (1997). The song reached number one on the Australian ARIA Singles Chart, Silverchair's second single to do so after "Tomorrow" in 1994. The band would not have another number-one hit until "Straight Lines" in 2007. One of the B-sides of the single is a cover of "New Race" by Australian band Radio Birdman.

Music video
The music video for "Freak" was directed by Gerald Casale, a member of Devo. The video was filmed in Los Angeles, California, on 5 and 6 December 1996.

The video features the band playing in an oven-chamber, monitored by a scientist in a control room. Their sweat is collected by a doctor and taken to an elderly woman in an adjoining room. The doctor touches part of her flesh with the sweat, and it smoothens. The doctor injects a large amount of sweat into the woman, and she regresses to being middle-aged. The doctor calls for more sweat, so the scientist turns up the heat, as high as 175 °F in the oven-chamber, causing the band members to sweat even more. Their sweat drains into a sort of water cooler, where the doctor collects a glass of it. She gives this to the woman, and when she drinks it, her youth returns. However, she is still not satisfied, so she orders and drinks another dose and turns into an alien mutant. She loves the new look and pays the doctor. When this is all done, the heat lamps are turned off, and the room now seems to appear very cold. The band punch out their time cards and walk out.

The heat lamps in the video are actually orange lights; the band members were sprayed with water to make it look like they were heavily sweating. The scenes featuring the old woman were filmed separately at another studio.

The video for "Freak" won the International Viewer's Choice Award for MTV Australia at the 1997 MTV Video Music Awards

Live performances
The song is one of the few songs from the album Freak Show that Silverchair played live in the years prior to the band's "indefinite hibernation" in 2011. These versions often differed significantly from the studio version. In addition to being played a half-step down in key (Drop C#/Db), the song would often be extended, featuring a whammy pedal for the solo, often improvised. The vocals would often feature addition improvisation, featuring screamed, death growls, and falsetto that were not present on the original recording. One version featuring these changes can be found on the Live from Faraway Stables album/concert film in 2003, and another on the Across the Great Divide Tour concert film in 2007.

Track listings
 Australian CD single and limited-edition 7-inch vinyl (MATTCD040; MATTV040)
 UK limited 10-inch vinyl (664076 0)
 "Freak"
 "New Race"
 "Punk Song #2"
 The Australian vinyl version of the single comes in various extremely rare coloured editions: gold/yellow, clear, semi-clear/various colours, pink-marbled clear, smoked yellow, smoked red, and "no one knows which other colors". The UK 10-inch vinyl includes 10-inch collectible cards.

 UK CD single (6640765)
 "Freak"
 "New Race"
 "Undecided"
 "Slave" (Live)
 This formats contains collectible cards. "Undecided" is not the Silverchair track included on Frogstomp: this is a cover of the 1966 single by the Masters Apprentices.

 European CD single (6640762)
 "Freak"
 "New Race"
 "Punk Song #2"
 "Interview"

Charts

Weekly charts

Year-end charts

Certification

In popular culture
The song appears during the closing credits of the animated television show Daria episode "Malled".

References

External links
 

1997 singles
1997 songs
Number-one singles in Australia
Silverchair songs
Song recordings produced by Nick Launay
Songs written by Daniel Johns